The 2015 Radio Disney Music Awards were held and filmed on April 25, 2015, at the Microsoft Theater in Los Angeles, California. The show premiered on Sunday, April 26, 2015 at 8/7c on Radio Disney and Disney Channel. For the first time, the broadcast nominees for the awards show were announced in a televised special, Disney Channel Presents the 2015 RDMA Nomination Special, on 27 February 2015 on Disney Channel. All categories and nominees were highlighted on the Radio Disney’s 2015 RDMA Nomination Special, a two-hour on-air programming feature that was aired the next day.

The main show included  Fifth Harmony, Nick Jonas, Becky G, R5, Natalie La Rose, Sheppard, Rachel Platten, Tori Kelly, Shawn Mendes and Sabrina Carpenter. The opening act was performed by The Fooo Conspiracy, Jessica Sanchez, Jacquie Lee, Sweet Suspense and Alex Angelo

Performances

Pre-show

Main show

Presenters

Ashley Benson
Fifth Harmony
Carly Rae Jepsen
Chelsea Kane
Joe Jonas
The cast of Teen Beach 2:
Garrett Clayton
Grace Phipps
Chrissie Fit
Sweet Suspense
Kelsea Ballerini
Laura Marano
Rachel Platten
The cast of Black-ish: 
Yara Shahidi
Marcus Sribner
Miles Brown
Marsai Martin
Rowan Blanchard
Ben Savage
Jacquie Lee
Olivia Holt
Dove Cameron
The cast of Dancing with the Stars:
Rumer Willis
Val Chmerkovskiy
Chris Soules
Witney Carson
Carrie Ann Inaba
Brent Rivera
Jacob Whitesides
Carla Maldonado 
Hailee Steinfeld
Brooke Taylor
Candace Huckeba
The cast of The Fosters:
Maia Mitchell
David Lambert
Hayden Byerly
Cierra Ramirez
The cast of K.C. Undercover:<ref
name=presenters/>
Kadeem Hardison
Tammy Townsend
Veronica Dunne
Kamil Mcfadden 
Trinitee Stokes

Winners and Nominees
The nominees were announced on February 27, 2015.

Compilation album
A compilation album featuring various 2015 RDMA nominees was released on April 21, 2015, through Walt Disney Records.

References

Radio Disney Music Awards
Radio Disney
Radio Disney
Radio Disney Music Awards
2015 awards in the United States